Henryk Markiewicz (16 November 1922 – 31 October 2013) was a Polish historian, specializing in the history and theory of literature, with the particular focus on the Polish literature of 1864-1939. He was a professor emeritus of the Jagiellonian University, where he was a director of the Institute of Polish Philology. He was a member of the Polish Academy of Science and the Polish Academy of Learning. He has been one of the editors of the Polski Słownik Biograficzny, as well as several other historical book series. He has published a number of books and articles.

External links
Homepage at the Jagiellonian University

Recipients of the Order of Polonia Restituta
1922 births
2013 deaths
Academic staff of Jagiellonian University
Polish literary historians
Literary theorists
Collaborators of the Polish Biographical Dictionary